John Neilson (March 11, 1745 – March 3, 1833) commanded the New Jersey militia in the northern part of the state during the American Revolution, served in the New Jersey legislature during and after the Revolution, and was one of the earliest trustees of Rutgers University.  He is also notable for one of the earliest public readings of the Declaration of Independence, which was recently immortalized in a statue located at Monument Square Park in New Brunswick.

Early life
Neilson was born in Raritan Landing to Dr. John Neilson, an Irish physician who emigrated to the Colonies in 1740, and Joanna Coeymans of Dutch ancestry.

Neilson's father died eight days after his birth. He was admitted to the University of Pennsylvania in 1758, but he did not complete his studies.

Reading of the Declaration of Independence
Neilson, on July 9, 1776, stood on a table in front of the White Hall Tavern on Albany Street in New Brunswick, read the Declaration of Independence aloud for the third official (and approved) time. The audience consisted largely of supporters of American independence who cheered at the conclusion of the reading, though several Loyalists were present. On July 9, 2017, a statue entitled The Third Reading of the Declaration of Independence depicting Neilson was unveiled at Monument Square Park.

Career during the Revolutionary War
Prior to the Revolution Neilson worked as a merchant in his uncle's shipping business in New Brunswick and in ownership of a salt mine in Toms River operated by Major John Van Emburgh.  

At the beginning of the Revolution Neilsen, in his own words, bitterly resented "the attempt of a venal Parliament, bought by an oppressive minority, to tax his country." In 1775 he raised a militia and was active throughout the conflict. On August 31, 1775, Neilson was commissioned by the Provincial Congress of New Jersey and appointed Colonel of a battalion of Minutemen for Middlesex County. He achieved the rank of Brigadier General in February 1777 after achieving an early battle success.

One of Neilson's earliest engagements was the Battle of Bennett Island, located on the Raritan River and key to the defense of New Brunswick, in early 1777. Leading the Second Regiment of the Middlesex militia, he and his force of 150 militiamen (reinforced in part with help from General Israel Putnam and 50 Pennsylvanian riflemen), used intelligence from a defector to attack a Loyalist regiment of the New Jersey Volunteers led by Major Richard Witham Stockton, a first cousin of Declaration signer Richard Stockton. With only losing a militiaman, Neilsen's forces successfully captured Major Stockton along with Captain Asher Dunham, Lieutenant Fraser, and 62 Loyalists.  The officers were transferred to General Putnam's control where he was stationed 15 miles south at Princeton. Neilson's victory was noted by George Washington to Congress soon thereafter.
 

In 1778 he was appointed to the Second Continental Congress, but he elected not to serve. In 1779 he represented Middlesex County in the New Jersey State Legislature.

Family 
In 1768 Neilson married Catharine Schuyler Voorhees, a descendant of the Schuyler family. They had 11 children, six of which survived past infancy:
 Colonel James Neilson (1784-1862), who married four times.
 Abraham Schuyler Neilson (1792-1861), who married Catherine Stevens Grant.
 John Neilson (1775-1857), a doctor who married Abigail Bleecker, a daughter of Anthony Lispenard Bleecker. Their son was Henry A. Neilson
 Joanna Neilson (1786-1858)
 Gertrude Neilson (1780-1862), who married Rev. George Spofford Woodhull

Michael Douglas is a descendant through his mother Diana Dill whose mother was Ruth Neilson.

References

External links
 
 

1745 births
1833 deaths
American people of Dutch descent
American people of Irish descent
American slave owners
People from Piscataway, New Jersey
People of colonial New Jersey
New Jersey militiamen in the American Revolution
Militia generals in the American Revolution